Collateral freedom is an anti-censorship strategy that attempts to make it economically prohibitive for censors to block content on the Internet. This is achieved by hosting content on cloud services that are considered by censors to be "too important to block," and then using encryption to prevent censors from identifying requests for censored information that is hosted among other content, forcing censors to either allow access to the censored information or take down entire services.

See also 
 Cute cat theory of digital activism
 Domain fronting
 Lantern (software)
 Refraction networking
 Telex (anti-censorship system)

References 

Computer security
Secure communication
Internet censorship